Sam Shing Estate is a public housing estate in Tuen Mun, New Territories, Hong Kong, near Light Rail Sam Shing stop and Castle Peak Beach. Built on the reclaimed land of Castle Peak Bay, it is the third public housing estate in Tuen Mun and the estate consists of 3 residential blocks completed in 1980. It was named for nearby Sam Shing Hui, a fishing village in the district, and most of the residents in the estate were fishermen.

Houses

Demographics
According to the 2016 by-census, Sam Shing Estate had a population of 5,044. The median age was 43.4 and the majority of residents (96.3 per cent) were of Chinese ethnicity. The average household size was 2.8 people. The median monthly household income of all households (i.e. including both economically active and inactive households) was HK$20,500.

Politics
Sam Shing Estate is located in Sam Shing constituency of the Tuen Mun District Council. It was formerly represented by Michael Mo Kwan-tai, who was elected in the 2019 elections until July 2021.

Education
Sam Shing Estate is in Primary One Admission (POA) School Net 71. Within the school net are multiple aided schools (operated independently but funded with government money); no government schools are in the school net.

See also

Public housing estates in Tuen Mun

References

Residential buildings completed in 1980
Tuen Mun
Tuen Mun District
Public housing estates in Hong Kong
Housing estates with centralized LPG system in Hong Kong
1980 establishments in Hong Kong